Johnny Hooper may refer to:
 Johnny Hooper (sailor)
 Johnny Hooper (water polo)

See also
 John Hooper (disambiguation)